Shi Shi (c. 1970s – d. July 5, 2008), or "Rock", was a male giant panda who briefly stayed at the San Diego Zoo.  He was the father of Hua Mei.

History
Shi Shi was taken from the wild in Sichuan, China in 1992.  He was rehabilitated and sent to San Diego Zoo as the mate for Bai Yun in 1996.  In 1999, Bai Yun was artificially inseminated with sperm from Shi Shi and Hua Mei was their offspring. It was eventually determined that he was much older than was originally assumed, and he was replaced by Gao Gao as Bai Yun's mate.

Shi Shi lived out his remaining years in China at the Guangzhou Zoo and died on July 5, 2008.

References

1970s animal births
Individual giant pandas
2008 animal deaths
San Diego Zoo